State Route 19 (SR 19) or the Tina Turner Highway is a state highway in Haywood and Lauderdale counties in Tennessee, United States. State Route 19 is 42.81 mi (69 km) long.

The Mississippi River valley with flood plains and bluffs, the rolling hills of Tennessee and cotton fields dominate the rural landscape of the area traversed by SR 19. Industries are present in the urban areas of Ripley and Brownsville.

A segment of State Route 19 between Brownsville and Nutbush was named "Tina Turner Highway" in 2002 after singer Tina Turner who spent her childhood in Nutbush. State Route 19 is mentioned in her song "Nutbush City Limits".
State Route 19 is located on the southeastern edge of the New Madrid Seismic Zone, an area with a high earthquake risk. At the west end of the route, Island No. 30 of the Mississippi River was created by earthquake activity in the early 19th century, when the river changed course permanently.

Counties traversed

State Route 19 traverses the counties (west to east) shown in the table below.

Route description

State Route 19 begins in Golddust at the intersection of Crutcher Lake Road and Four Mile Lane. The first several miles of SR 19 traverse the Mississippi River valley with expansive flood plains and large farmland. SR 19 ascends a steep bluff and traverses the rolling hills of West Tennessee as it continues east through Ripley, Nutbush and Brownsville to reach its eastern terminus at I-40.

Mississippi River to Ripley
From Golddust in Lauderdale County all the way east to Ripley SR 19 is designated secondary. It intersects US 51 west of Ripley, east of the US 51 intersection the route continues designated primary.

Starting near the banks of the Mississippi River, State Route 19 runs northeast, parallel to the river, for about 5 mi (8 km) in the flood plains. It continues east, through the bluffs, then passing low cotton fields and hills until it reaches Ripley, also in Lauderdale County.

On a 1 mi (1.6 km) long bypass west of Ripley, SR 19 and US 51 overlap on the US 51 bypass. South of Ripley, at the southern end of the overlap with US 51, SR 19-Bypass continues eastbound for 2.5 mi (4 km), it ends at Linda Rd in Ripley and continues as primary State Route 19.

Mississippi River Island No. 30 – At the west end of State Route 19, near Golddust, Tennessee, Island No. 30 of the Mississippi River was created during the 1811–12 New Madrid earthquakes when the Mississippi River changed course permanently.

Ripley to Brownsville

Between Ripley in Lauderdale County and Brownsville in Haywood County the route it is designated primary.

The segment passes through a hilly landscape, dominated by cotton fields. From Ripley, SR 19 continues through the unincorporated community of Nutbush in Haywood County all the way to Brownsville.

In Nutbush, SR 180 starts, continuing north to Gates, Tennessee.

Historic State Route 19 – East of Nutbush in Haywood County, a section of Old SR 19 parallels State Route 19 just south of the route for about 5 mi (8 km) through a rural area along cotton fields and through the rolling hills of West Tennessee.

Tina Turner Highway – In 2002, State Route 19 between Nutbush and Brownsville and was named "Tina Turner Highway" after singer Tina Turner who spent her childhood in Nutbush.

Brownsville to Interstate 40
The segment of SR 19 east of Brownsville in Haywood County to the eastern terminus of SR 19 at I-40 Exit 60 (Mercer Road), also in Haywood County, is designated secondary.

In Brownsville State Route 19 intersects SR 54 (Main Street). South of Brownsville the route intersects US 70 and US 79. State Route 19 and US 70/US 79 overlap for 2 mi (3.2 km) on the US 70/US 79 bypass south of Brownsville. At Jefferson Street, US 70/US 79 continue north and State Route 19 leaves the overlap and continues east as secondary SR 19 all the way to I-40.

Industries are present along the route in the urban area between Brownsville and I-40. The agricultural landscape of the area east of Brownsville is dominated by cotton fields.

Points of interest

Points of interest along State Route 19 (west to east).

 Mississippi River
 Lauderdale County Tomato Festival, Ripley
 Nutbush, Tennessee, childhood home of singer Tina Turner
 Trinity United Methodist Church, Nutbush
 Woodlawn Baptist Church and Cemetery, Nutbush

History

Earthquake risk

State Route 19 is situated on the southeastern edge of the New Madrid Seismic Zone, an area with a high earthquake risk.

In 1811 and 1812 several earthquakes with an epicenter near New Madrid, Missouri caused permanent changes in the course of the Mississippi River in a wide area, including the Mississippi River valley in West Tennessee.

Mississippi River Island No. 30
At the western terminus of State Route 19, northwest of Golddust, Tennessee, Island No. 30 of the Mississippi River was created during the New Madrid earthquakes when the Mississippi River changed course permanently, shortening the river by about 1.5 mi (2,4 km), and cutting off part of Lauderdale County, Tennessee, placing it on the other side of the river, the Mississippi County, Arkansas side northeast of Osceola.

Agriculture and industry

After the abolition of slavery, sharecropping was the primary means of income for low income families in the area along SR 19. Mostly for the cultivation of cotton, land would be used by sharecroppers in return for a share of the crop to the landowner.

Modern agriculture
Modern machines like the cotton picker have made the manual cultivation obsolete over time as they took over the work from the hand laborers.

In 2006, a cotton-processing plant exists in Nutbush at the junction of SR 180 and State Route 19.

The Lauderdale County Tomato Festival is an annual celebration of the tomato close to State Route 19 in Ripley, Lauderdale County.

Lagoon Creek Peaking Facility
Lagoon Creek Peaking Facility is run by the Tennessee Valley Authority (TVA) in Nutbush not far from State Route 19. From eight gas turbines the power plant generates electric power for the area in times of high demand.

Pioneer musicians
The early black and white musicians and singers from the Nutbush churches along today's State Route 19 recorded and influenced an international audience.

Nutbush is the birthplace and home community of black and white pioneer musicians and prominent recording artists such as Hambone Willie Newbern and Sleepy John Estes.  Harmonica player Noah Lewis of Henning, Tennessee is buried in an area cemetery near Nutbush.

Tina Turner Highway

In 2002, Tennessee State Route 19 between Nutbush and Brownsville was officially designated "Tina Turner Highway" in honor of the singer.

"Nutbush City Limits"
State Route 19 is mentioned in the Tina Turner song "Nutbush City Limits" (1973, produced by Ike Turner) as "Highway number nineteen".

According to the song, there was a speed limit of 25 mph (40 km/h) ("Twenty-five was the speed limit") on State Route 19 in the city of Nutbush at one time.

Historic State Route 19

East of Nutbush, in Haywood County, a section of Old SR 19 parallels State Route 19 just south of the main route for about 5 mi (8 km), covering about two-thirds of the distance from Nutbush to Brownsville on the old route through a rural area along cotton fields and through the rolling hills of West Tennessee.

Trinity United Methodist Church, founded in 1822, is located just south of Nutbush, along old State Route 19.

Woodlawn Baptist Church, a US historic location, is on Woodlawn Rd., ca. 3 mi (4,8 km) southeast of Nutbush, just north of old SR 19. The church was a family church of singer Tina Turner. She attended and sang in the choir growing up. Her family members were church officials, musicians and singers who are buried in the cemetery.

Old-State Route 19 and SR 19 join again at Bobby Mann Rd, 3 mi (4.8 km) northwest of Brownsville.

Major intersections

See also

 List of Tennessee state highways
 List of highways numbered 19
 Nutbush City Limits, (Tina Turner song)

References

Further reading

External links

 Tennessee Department of Transportation
 Official Lauderdale County Website
 Haywood County Official Web Site

019
Transportation in Lauderdale County, Tennessee
Transportation in Haywood County, Tennessee
Tina Turner